Darlington by-election may refer to one of three parliamentary by-elections for the British House of Commons constituency of Darlington, in County Durham:

 1923 Darlington by-election
 1926 Darlington by-election
 1983 Darlington by-election